Arctous is a genus of plants referred to by the common name "bearberry", a name sometimes shared with certain species of the related genus Arctostaphylos, in particular, A. uva-ursi. Although the two genera are related, certain characters, such as deciduous, marcescent leaves, rugose-reticulate venation, and finely-toothed leaves are more typical of Arctous than Arctostaphylos.

Species within the genus include the following:

Arctous alpina (L.) Nied.			
Arctous microphyllus C.Y.Wu		
Arctous rubra (Rehder & E.H.Wilson) Nakai

References

Arbutoideae
Ericaceae genera